Ulster Scots, may refer to:
 Ulster Scots people
 Ulster Scots dialect

Language and nationality disambiguation pages